Addams is a neighborhood in Long Beach, California. It lies within the North Long Beach area. The neighborhood is named for the activist Jane Addams, and is home to the Jane Addams Neighborhood Association.

Grace Park is named to honor the nationally recognized herpetologist Grace Olive Wiley, who lived in the district.

See also
Neighborhoods of Long Beach, California

References

Geography of Long Beach, California
Addams